Svetlana Ognjenović (born 26 January 1981) is a Serbian handball player. She is a member of the Serbian national team.

References

External links
EHF profile

Living people
1981 births
Serbs of Croatia
Sportspeople from Osijek
Serbian female handball players
Mediterranean Games silver medalists for Serbia
Competitors at the 2005 Mediterranean Games
Mediterranean Games medalists in handball